Cobi Cockburn is an Australian glass artist. Her works are held in the Art Gallery of Western Australia, Palm Springs Art Museum and the Corning Museum of Glass, New York.

Biography 
Cockburn is from New South Wales and completed a Bachelor of Visual Arts (2000) and a Master of Fine Arts (2016) at Sydney College of the Arts. She is also a graduate of the Glass Workshop with a Bachelor of Visual Arts (Hons) (2006) from the Australian National University in Canberra.

Awards 
Cockburn received the Tom Malone Prize from the Art Gallery of Western Australia in 2015 and 2009 and the Ranamok Glass Prize in 2006.  In 2007 she won the Lino Tagliapietra Prize at Talente 2007 in Germany and Emerge in the USA. She was joint artist-in-residence with Charles Butcher at Tylee Cottage in Whanganui, New Zealand in 2011–12.

References

Living people
Year of birth missing (living people)
Australian glass artists
21st-century Australian artists
Australian National University alumni